Chaudhry Imtiaz Ahmed is a Pakistani politician who had been a member of the National Assembly of Pakistan from August 2018 till January 2023. He belongs to the Gujar family.

Personal life 
Haji Imtiaz Ahmad Chaudhary was born in 1958. He is the son of Haji Ahmad. He has a wife, 2 daughters and 3 sons in his family. His education is Matric. He is an agriculturist and Businessman by profession. His source of income is Agriculture and Business.

Political career  
He was elected from the constituency NA-85 Mandi Bahauddin. He has served as a Chairman Public complaint Bureau with a former Prime Minister Shaukat Aziz from 2004 to 2007.

Reference

Living people
Punjabi people
Year of birth missing (living people)